This list of Maryland state parks includes the state parks and state battlefields listed in the Maryland Department of Natural Resources's current acreage report. Generally, the Maryland Park Service, a unit of and under the authority of the Maryland Department of Natural Resources (DNR), is the governing body for these parks, although some have been turned over to local authorities.

Maryland state parks

Maryland state battlefields

Maryland natural resources management areas

Other Maryland state areas

Former Maryland state parks
The former Jonas Green State Park was transferred to Anne Arundel County and became Jonas and Anne Catharine Green Park.

See also
List of National Park System areas in Maryland

References

External links

State Park Directory Maryland Department of Natural Resources
Maryland State Parks Maryland Manual On-Line, Maryland State Archives

 
Maryland state parks